Liver spread is a Filipino canned spread product made from pureed pork, beef, or chicken liver mixed with cereal and/or offal similar to the French pâté and German liverwurst. Liver spread is usually eaten as a filling for sandwich bread and an accompaniment to crackers but it is also used as an ingredient in dishes like lechon sauce and the Tagalog version of paksiw na lechon. It is also used in some households as an ingredient to some dishes e.g. caldereta and Filipino spaghetti.

See also

 Banana ketchup
 Mama Sita's Holding Company

References 

Condiments
Philippine condiments
Food paste
Philippine cuisine
Liver (food)
Offal
Spreads (food)
Ground meat